Bloomsbury is an area in central London.

Bloomsbury may also refer to:

Places
 Bloomsbury (ward), related local government unit
 Bloomsbury, New Jersey, New Jersey, USA
 Bloomsbury (Frederick, Maryland), listed on the NRHP in Maryland
 Bloomsbury (Orange, Virginia), listed on the NRHP in Virginia
 Bloomsbury Farm (Spotsylvania County, Virginia), listed on the NRHP in Virginia
 Bloomsbury, Alberta, a locality in Canada

Other
 Bloomsbury (horse), a Thoroughbred racehorse, winner of the 1839 Epsom Derby
 Bloomsbury, a 1905 novel by Charles Francis Keary
 Bloomsbury Group, an English literary group active from around 1905
 Bloomsbury Gang, a political grouping  in 1765 
 Bloomsbury Publishing, British publisher
 Bloomsbury Theatre, London